The siege of Izmail was a military investment fought in 1790 on the Black Sea during the Russo-Turkish War (1787–1792). The Russians were led by Alexander Suvorov, who had defeated the Ottomans at Kinburn, Ochakov, and Focsani. The Black Sea flotilla was commanded by the Spanish admiral José de Ribas.

In March 1790, the Russians began besieging Izmail, in the region of Budjak (now in Ukraine), which had a garrison of 40,000 soldiers. Suvorov had 31,000 troops and on the morning of 22 December 1790, the Russians began attacking the city. They bombarded Izmail until 3:00 am, and then stormed it at 5:30 am. The Russians advanced on the north, east, and west. The walls were weaker there than in other places, where it took Russian troops longer to attack. By 8:00 am. the Russians had entered the city. In total, the Ottoman forces had more than 26,000 killed with the whole garrison being killed, wounded, or captured. The Russian forces suffered only 4,330 casualties, out of which 1,815 were killed.

To the victory was dedicated the anthem "Grom pobedy, razdavaysya!" (Let the thunder of victory sound!) which was an unofficial Russian national anthem in the late 18th and early 19th centuries. Today it is commemorated as a Day of Military Honour in Russia.

The siege is dramatized in cantos 7 and 8 of Lord Byron's verse-novel Don Juan (1823). His principal source, he states in the preface, was Gabriel de Castelnau's account of the siege in Essai sur l’histoire ancienne et moderne de la Nouvelle Russie (1820).

The monument to Alexander Suvorov in Izmail's city centre was placed in temporary storage on 12 November 2022, until city deputies decide where it will be kept permanently.

References 

 Russian armies captured a Turkish fortress Izmail (Yeltsin Presidential Library)
 

Izmail
Izmail
Izmail
Military history of Ukraine
1780s in Ukraine
Alexander Suvorov